Takatori Station is the name of two train stations in Japan.

Takatori Station (Hiroshima) - (高取駅) in Hiroshima, Hiroshima Prefecture
Takatori Station (Hyōgo) - (鷹取駅) in Kobe, Hyogo Prefecture